K.M.Bhaskaran (aka) KMB  is an Indian cinematographer who works in the Tamil film industry, is a cinematography student from M.G.R. Government Film and Television Training Institute. He started his career as cinematographer in the movie Vallinam.

Career
K.M.Bhaskaran started his career as a cinematographer in Arivazhagan Venkatachalam's directorial Vallinam, a national award-winning movie for the best editing, starring Nakul. The movie, based on Basketball game garnered positive reviews from critics and audiences. His work in the climax sequence was specially mentioned. His next association was with his mentor Vijay Milton for the Vikram and Samantha Ruth Prabhu starrer 10 Endrathukulla which was produced by well known director AR Murugadoss under Fox Star Studios. Though the movie garnered mixed reviews, the cinematography was lauded. His previous project was again with director Arivazhagan Venkatachalam for the movie Kuttram 23 starring Arun Vijay, after their first successful outing. He was lauded for his visual story telling in Kuttram 23, this movie done good in box-office too. His latest movie Kannum Kannum Kollaiyadithaal starring Dulquer Salmaan , Ritu Varma , Gautham Vasudev Menon.

Filmography

References

Sources
 Kuttram 23 team shoots climax sequence in Chennai, The New Indian Express, 8 June 2016 
 https://www.cinemaspeak.in/2020/02/review-kannum-kannum-kollaiyadithaal.html , 29 feb 2020
 https://timesofindia.indiatimes.com/entertainment/tamil/movie-reviews/kannum-kannum-kollaiyadithaal/movie-review/74381799.cms 28 feb 2020
 https://m.behindwoods.com/tamil-movies/kannum-kannum-kollaiyadithaal/kannum-kannum-kollaiyadithaal-review.html 28 feb 2020
 https://www.newindianexpress.com/entertainment/tamil/2020/mar/04/how-to-frame-a-heist-cinematographer-km-bhaskaran-spills-the-beans-2111736.html 4 March 2020
 https://cinema.vikatan.com/tamil-cinema/movie-review-kannum-kannum-kollaiyadithaal 5 March 2020
 http://www.cineobserver.in/review-kannum-kannum-kollaiyadithaal 28 feb 2020
 www.dtnext.in 18 march 2020
 www.dtnext.in 20 may 2022
 https://www.newindianexpress.com/entertainment/tamil/2022/may/26/capturingthe-campus-dons-cinematographer-narrates-his-lifes-parallel-tales-in-movie-2457923.html 26 may 2022
 https://www.cinemaexpress.com/tamil/interviews/2022/may/25/km-bhaskarani-teared-up-while-shooting-the-climax-of-don-31760.html 26 may 2022

External links
 
 
 

Tamil film cinematographers
Cinematographers from Tamil Nadu
Indian Tamil people
Living people
Artists from Chennai
Year of birth missing (living people)